Sophie Métadier (born 26 April 1961) is a French urban planner and politician of the Union of Democrats and Independents who has served as a Member of Parliament since 2021.

Political career 
She was elected in a by-election triggered by the resignation of Sophie Auconie.

She lost her seat in the first round of the 2022 legislative election.

References 

1961 births
Living people
Deputies of the 15th National Assembly of the French Fifth Republic

Union of Democrats and Independents politicians
Women members of the National Assembly (France)
Politicians from Paris
21st-century French women politicians